"Heart Hotels" is a song written and recorded by the American singer-songwriter Dan Fogelberg. The song appears on Fogelberg's 1979 album Phoenix.  It was the second of two single releases from the LP.

Background
"Heart Hotels" is a metaphor for protracted loneliness, bordering on despair. The song features a Lyricon solo by acclaimed session musician Tom Scott.

Personnel
 Dan Fogelberg – lead and backing vocals, acoustic and electric guitars, Prophet 5, electric and acoustic pianos, orchestral arrangements
 Russ Kunkel – congas
 Jody Linscott – conductor
 Andy Newmark – drums
 Norbert Putnam – bass guitar
 Tom Scott – saxophone, lyricon
 Sid Sharp – concertmaster
 Glen Spreen – orchestral arrangements

Weekly charts
In the spring of 1980, the song peaked at #21 in the U.S. and #3 on Billboard magazine's Adult Contemporary chart. It was a lesser hit in Canada.

References

External links
 

1980 singles
Dan Fogelberg songs
Songs written by Dan Fogelberg
1979 songs
Full Moon Records singles
Epic Records singles